Lester is a surname and given name.

Lester may also refer to:

Places

United States
Lester, Alabama, a town
Lester, Georgia, an unincorporated community
Lester, Iowa, a city
Lester Township, Black Hawk County, Iowa
Lester, a community in Tinicum Township, Delaware County, Pennsylvania
Lester, Washington, a ghost town
Lester, West Virginia, a town
Lester River, which flows through Duluth, Minnesota

Elsewhere
Lester Peak, Ellsworth Land, Antarctica
Lester Cove, a cove in Graham Land, Antarctica
14583 Lester, an asteroid

Other uses
 Hurricane Lester (disambiguation)
 USS Lester (DE-1022), a destroyer escort
 Cromer Lifeboat Lester ON 1287, a lifeboat stationed at Cromer, Norfolk, England
 Lester Award, a horse racing award given in Great Britain to jockeys
 Lester's Foods Ltd., a Canadian meat processor
 Lester's theorem in geometry
 Lester Public Library, Two Rivers, Wisconsin
 Lester Apartments, a former building in Seattle, Washington

See also
Leicester (disambiguation)